At least two warships of Japan have borne the name Sendai:

 , was a  launched in 1923 and sunk in 1943
 , is an  launched in 1990

Japanese Navy ship names